= Parapan =

Parapan may refer to:

- Parapan, a trade name for the drug Paracetamol
- Parapan American Games, a multi-sport event for athletes with physical disabilities held every four years after the Pan American Games
